Acer leipoense is a species of maple, endemic to southwestern Sichuan in southwestern China. It is an endangered species, growing at altitudes of 2,000–2,700 m.

It is a deciduous small tree growing to 8 meters tall. The leaves are shallowly lobed with three lobes, 9–11 cm long and 7–12 cm broad.

References

leipoense
Endemic flora of China
Trees of China
Critically endangered flora of Asia
Plants described in 1966
Taxonomy articles created by Polbot